South Sea Love is a 1927 American silent drama film directed by Ralph Ince and starring Patsy Ruth Miller, Lee Shumway, and Alan Brooks.

Cast
 Patsy Ruth Miller as Charlotte Guest  
 Lee Shumway as Fred Stewart  
 Alan Brooks as Tom Malloy  
 Harry Crocker as Bob Bernard  
 Barney Gilmore as George Billways  
 Gertrude Howard as Moana  
 Albert Conti as Max Weber  
 Everett Brown as Nahalo  
 Harry Wallace as Jake Streeter

References

Bibliography
 Quinlan, David. The Illustrated Guide to Film Directors. Batsford, 1983.

External links

SouthSeasCinema; a website devoted to Pacific Island themed films

1927 films
Films directed by Ralph Ince
American silent feature films
1920s English-language films
American black-and-white films
Silent American drama films
1927 drama films
Film Booking Offices of America films
1920s American films